The 2015 Heilbronner Neckarcup was a professional tennis tournament played on clay courts. It was the second edition of the tournament which was part of the 2015 ATP Challenger Tour. It took place in Heilbronn, Germany between 11 and 17 May 2015.

Singles main-draw entrants

Seeds

 1 Rankings are as of May 4, 2015.

Other entrants
The following players received wildcards into the singles main draw:
  Daniel Brands
  Jan Choinski
  Nils Langer

The following players received entry from the qualifying draw:
  Jesse Huta Galung
  Jeremy Jahn
  Jozef Kovalík
  Mats Moraing

The following player received entry as a lucky loser:
  Henri Laaksonen

Doubles main-draw entrants

Seeds

 1 Rankings are as of May 4, 2015.

Other entrants
The following pairs received wildcards into the doubles main draw:
  Florian Fallert /  Nils Langer
  Alexander Zverev /  Mischa Zverev

The following pair received entry as an alternate:
  Alexander Mannapov /  Mats Moraing

Champions

Singles

 Alexander Zverev def.  Guido Pella, 6–1, 7–6(9–7)

Doubles

 Mateusz Kowalczyk /  Igor Zelenay def.  Dominik Meffert /  Tim Pütz, 6–4, 6–3

External links
Official Website

Heilbronner Neckarcup
Heilbronner Neckarcup
May 2015 sports events in Europe
2015 in German tennis